The Story County Wind Farm is a 300 megawatt wind energy farm in Iowa, half of which went online in November 2008 and the other half went online in December 2009. It can be seen when driving toward Ames on Highway 30.

See also

List of onshore wind farms
List of wind farms in the United States

References

Energy infrastructure completed in 2008
Energy infrastructure completed in 2009
Buildings and structures in Story County, Iowa
Wind farms in Iowa
2008 establishments in Iowa